Center Cross is an unincorporated community in Essex County, in the U.S. state of Virginia.

Monte Verde was listed on the National Register of Historic Places in 2002.

References

Unincorporated communities in Virginia
Unincorporated communities in Essex County, Virginia